The United States embassy in Mauritania is located in Nouakchott. Mauritania – United States relations have been developing since 1960. The incumbent ambassador is Cynthia Kierscht.

Ambassadors
Henry S. Villard – Career FSO
Title: Envoy Extraordinary and Minister Plenipotentiary.
Resident in, and concurrent US Ambassador to, neighbouring Senegal
Appointed: November 28, 1960
Terminated mission: Left post, April 30, 1961
Philip M. Kaiser – Career FSO
Title: Envoy Extraordinary and Minister Plenipotentiary.
Resident in, and concurrent US Ambassador to, neighbouring Senegal
Appointed: August 1, 1961
Terminated mission: Left post, May 18, 1964
William L. Eagleton, Jr – Career FSO
Title: Envoy Extraordinary and Minister Plenipotentiary. Ad Interim
Appointed: 1962
Terminated mission: 1964
Geoffrey W. Lewis – Career FSO
Title: Envoy Extraordinary and Minister Plenipotentiary. 
Appointed: March 31, 1965
Terminated mission: Left post, June 9, 1967
Robert A. Stein – Career FSO
Title: Envoy Extraordinary and Minister Plenipotentiary. 
Appointed: March 1970
Terminated mission: Left post, November 1971
Richard W. Murphy – Career FSO
Title: Envoy Extraordinary and Minister Plenipotentiary. 
Appointed: December 17, 1971
Terminated mission: Left post, June 5, 1974
Holsey G. Handyside – Career FSO
Title: Envoy Extraordinary and Minister Plenipotentiary. 
Appointed: April 15, 1975
Terminated mission: Left post, December 5, 1977
E. Gregory Kryza – Career FSO
Title: Envoy Extraordinary and Minister Plenipotentiary. 
Appointed: December 16, 1977
Terminated mission: Left post, June 29, 1980
Stanley N. Schrager – Career FSO
Title: Envoy Extraordinary and Minister Plenipotentiary. Ad Interim
Appointed: September 1980
Terminated mission: Left post, July 1982
Edward Brynn – Career FSO
Title: Envoy Extraordinary and Minister Plenipotentiary. Ad Interim
Appointed: July 1982
Terminated mission: Left post, February 1983
Edward Lionel Peck – Career FSO
Title: Envoy Extraordinary and Minister Plenipotentiary. 
Appointed: February 19, 1983
Terminated mission: Left post, July 7, 1985
Robert L. Pugh – Career FSO
Title: Envoy Extraordinary and Minister Plenipotentiary. 
Appointed: September 5, 1985
Terminated mission: Left post, July 5, 1988
William H. Twaddell – Career FSO
Title: Envoy Extraordinary and Minister Plenipotentiary. 
Appointed: October 6, 1988
Terminated mission: Left post, July 20, 1991
Gordon S. Brown – Career FSO
Title: Envoy Extraordinary and Minister Plenipotentiary. 
Appointed: September 5, 1991
Terminated mission: Left post, August 18, 1994
Dorothy Myers Sampas – Career FSO
Title: Envoy Extraordinary and Minister Plenipotentiary. 
Appointed: November 3, 1994
Terminated mission: Left post, July 4, 1997
Timberlake Foster – Career FSO
Title: Envoy Extraordinary and Minister Plenipotentiary. 
Appointed: November 11, 1997
Terminated mission: Left post, October 3, 2000
John W. Limbert – Career FSO
Title: Envoy Extraordinary and Minister Plenipotentiary. 
Appointed: November 21, 2000
Terminated mission: Left post, August 8, 2003
Joseph LeBaron – Career FSO
Title: Envoy Extraordinary and Minister Plenipotentiary. 
Appointed: September 1, 2003
Terminated mission: November 22, 2007
Mark Boulware – Career FSO
Title: Envoy Extraordinary and Minister Plenipotentiary. 
Appointed: November 22, 2007
Terminated mission: Left post, October 1, 2010
Jo Ellen Powell – Career FSO
Title: Envoy Extraordinary and Minister Plenipotentiary. 
Appointed: October 10, 2010
Terminated mission: Left post, December 12, 2013
Larry André Jr. – Career FSO
Title: Envoy Extraordinary and Minister Plenipotentiary
Nominated: January 6, 2014
Appointed: September 25, 2014
Presentation of credentials: November 3, 2014
Terminated mission: Left post, November 20, 2017
Michael Dodman – Career FSO
Title: Envoy Extraordinary and Minister Plenipotentiary
Nominated: July 27, 2017
Appointed: November 20, 2017
Presentation of credentials: March 13, 2018
Terminated mission: February 2021
Cynthia Kierscht – Career FSO
Title: Envoy Extraordinary and Minister Plenipotentiary
Nominated: June 18, 2020
Appointed: January 27, 2021
Presentation of credentials: June 22, 2021
Terminated mission: Incumbent

See also
Mauritania – United States relations
Foreign relations of Mauritania
Ambassadors of the United States

References

United States Department of State: Background notes on Mauritania

External links
 United States Department of State: Chiefs of Mission for Mauritania
 United States Department of State: Mauritania
 United States Embassy in Nouakchott

Mauritania

Lists of ambassadors to Mauritania